Blue Valley may refer to any one of the following:

Places
 Blue Valley, Malaysia, a town in Pahang, Malaysia
 Blue Valley (Wayne County, Utah), a region in Utah
 Blue Valley Unified School District, a unified school district in Kansas
 Blue Valley (comics)
Movies
 Blue Valley Songbird, a movie starring Dolly Parton